Nana Mint Cheikhna is a member of parliament in Mauritania.

References

Living people
Members of the Mauritanian Parliament
Year of birth missing (living people)